Mustafa Mümin Aksoy Paşa, also known as Gavûr Mümin, (b. 1892, İzmir, d. 24 January 1948, İzmir) was a member of the Kuva-yi Milliye, the irregular Turkish nationalist forces that fought in the Turkish War of Independence. He was also part of the Turkish Armed Forces. Aksoy was the son of Osmanzade İbrahim Bey', a nephew of Izimir's mayor Hacı Hasan Bey.

Military career 
In 1911, he graduated from the Beylerbeyi Reserve Officer School (Beylerbeyi Yedek Subay Okulu) as a lieutenant, after he served in the First Balkan War. He was stationed in Edirne and Çatalca.  He later served in the Gallipoli Campaign, called Çanakkale Savaşı in Turkish, and along the eastern front of the Turkish War of Independence. Prior to the Occupation of Izmir, Aksoy served as commander of the Izmir Gendermarie Regiment until 1920. During Greece's occupation of Turkey, he was part of the Turkish intelligence organization that formed in the Izmir region. While Mümin was director of the intelligence services, his uncle Hacı Hasan Paşa worked with the Greek administration. Mümin  continued his duties in Izmir with the aid of his uncle and presented himself as a Turkish officer working on behalf of the Greek administration. He gained the trust of the Greek commander Zafirios. He was given the nicknames Gavûr Kirye and Hain Mümin by the Turkish population of Izmir, who did not know the truth of his activities. Mümin  passed intelligence reports from the Greek occupation headquarters to the Ankara government.

Mümin Paşa's activities were discovered by the Greek force and he was arrested before the Great Offensive and taken to the Palamadi prison. After the Armistice of Mudanya he was sent to Palya İstratona prison, and eventually he went moved to the Lusiya Esir Camp. He was released after the Turkish War of Independence as part of the prisoner exchange agreements between Turkey and Greece. He returned to Turkey on April 5, 1923.

Death 
He took the name "Aksoy" after the Surname law was enacted. Mustafa Mümin Aksoy Paşa. He was engaged to Muhsine but died of tuberculosis en route to Hakkâri Province on 25 January 1948.

References 

1892 births
1948 deaths
Muslims from the Ottoman Empire
Ottoman military personnel of the Balkan Wars
Ottoman military personnel of World War I
Turkish military personnel of the Turkish War of Independence
Turkish military personnel of the Greco-Turkish War (1919–1922)
Turkish spies
20th-century deaths from tuberculosis
Tuberculosis deaths in Turkey